The 2019 Jack's Casino World Series of Darts Finals was the fifth staging of the World Series of Darts Finals tournament, organised by the Professional Darts Corporation. The tournament took place at the AFAS Live, Amsterdam, Netherlands, from 1–3 November 2019. It featured a field of 24 players.

James Wade was the defending champion after defeating Michael Smith 11–10 in the 2018 final. However, he lost 6–5 to Jonny Clayton in the second round; six seeds lost in total in the second round, the most in the tournament's history.

Michael van Gerwen won the tournament for the 4th time, his 15th World Series title in all, with an 11–2 win over Danny Noppert in the final.

Prize money
The total prize money increased from £250,000 to £300,000.

Qualification
The top eight players from the five World Series events of 2019 are seeded for this tournament. Those events are:

2019 US Darts Masters
2019 German Darts Masters
2019 Brisbane Darts Masters
2019 Melbourne Darts Masters
2019 New Zealand Darts Masters

In addition, the next four highest ranked players from the PDC Order of Merit following the 2019 World Grand Prix final on 12 October 2019 qualified. Eight further players were invited by the PDC, with four other players qualifying from the Tour Card Holder Qualifier in Barnsley on 16 October. 

The following players qualified for the tournament:

Draw

References

World Series of Darts
World Series of Darts
+2019
World Series of Darts Finals